Gatewood is an unincorporated community in southwest Ripley County, Missouri, United States. It is located approximately fourteen miles west-southwest of Doniphan on Route 142.

A post office called Gatewood was established in 1854, and closed in 2001. The community has the name of Richard Gatewood, a pioneer citizen.

References

Unincorporated communities in Ripley County, Missouri
Unincorporated communities in Missouri